Ben Vrackie (Scottish Gaelic: Beinn a' Bhreacaidh; sometimes anglicised as Ben Y Vrackie) is a mountain in Perthshire, Scotland. It lies north of the town of Pitlochry and reaches 841 m (2759 feet) high at its summit. The summit may be reached easily by a direct path from Pitlochry or Killiecrankie, and commands views of Pitlochry and the surrounding glens.

Corbetts
Mountains and hills of Perth and Kinross
Marilyns of Scotland
Sites of Special Scientific Interest in East Perth